HC Alleghe is a professional ice hockey team in Alleghe, Italy. The team plays in the country's second-tier Italian Hockey League and play at Stadio Alvise De Toni.

The team was the surprise winners of the 1992-93 Alpenliga. They were formerly coached by former NHL player Steve McKenna.

Notable players
 Rick Morocco

Women's teams
Alleghe Hockey women's team won the Italian Hockey League Women league.

References

Ice hockey clubs established in 1946
Ice hockey teams in Italy
Alpenliga teams
Sport in Veneto